Norman Hall (November 17, 1829 – September 29, 1917) was a Democratic member of the U.S. House of Representatives from Pennsylvania.

Biography
Norman Hall was born on the Muncy Farms, near Halls Station, Pennsylvania.  He was graduated from Dickinson College in Carlisle, Pennsylvania, in 1847.  He was engaged in the iron business.

Hall was elected as a Democrat to the Fiftieth Congress.  He was engaged in banking in Sharon, Pennsylvania.  He retired from active business, and died in Sharon in 1917.  Interment in Hall's Burying Ground in Halls Station.

Sources

The Political Graveyard

1829 births
1917 deaths
Democratic Party members of the United States House of Representatives from Pennsylvania
Dickinson College alumni
19th-century American politicians